Prisons in South Africa are run by the Department of Correctional Services. According to the ministry, there are approximately 34,000 employees of the department running 240 prisons. In those prisons are nearly 156,000 inmates as of August 2013. The prisons include minimum, medium and maximum security facilities. Since 2019, the Minister of Correctional Services has been Ronald Lamola.

Prison reform 

The prison system in South Africa was first introduced by the European settlers. Even in the pre-apartheid era, racial factors played a major role, with white prisoners living in better conditions and receiving better treatment than their black counterparts. During the apartheid era, cultural norms afforded the subjectivity of guilt to the assessment of the whites, which led to Black South Africans being adversely affected. Prisons were segregated on the basis of race during this period. In the post-apartheid era, a number of reforms were initiated, and the irrelevant role that race had played until then was removed.

Notable former prisoners
During the Apartheid era, many political activists were imprisoned for campaigning against the government. These include: ANC freedom fighters such as Nelson Mandela (1962-1990), Walter Sisulu, (1963-1989), Govan Mbeki (1963-1987), Raymond Mhlaba (1963-1989), Tokyo Sexwale (1977-1990) and many others. A notable recent inmate was Annanias Mathe, a serial killer, the only person to escape from the maximum security prison C Max in Pretoria.

Notable current and former prisons
Notable prisons include:
 Boksburg Prison in Boksburg, South Africa
 Brandvlei Correctional Centre in Worcester, Western Cape
 Drakenstein Correctional Centre, formerly Victor Verster Prison, near Paarl, Western Cape
 Grootvlei Prison near Bloemfontein, Free State
 Johannesburg Prison, also known as Sun City Jail, in Sun City, Johannesburg, Gauteng
 Kgosi Mampuru II Management Area, formerly Pretoria Central Prison, in Pretoria, Gauteng. C Max is its maximum security section.
 Kokstad Prison at Kokstad, KwaZulu-Natal
 Leeuwkop Maximum Correctional Centre in Bryanston, Gauteng
 Mangaung Prison in Bloemfontein, Free State
 Matatshe Prison at Thohoyandou, Limpopo
 Modderbee Prison in Benoni, Gauteng
 Old Gaol Building in Ingwavuma, KwaZulu-Natal
 Pollsmoor Prison in Tokai, Cape Town, Western Cape 
 Robben Island off the coast of Cape Town, Western Cape
 Westville Prison at Westville, KwaZulu-Natal
 Zonderwater Prison near Cullinan, Gauteng

References

External links
 Official Web site of the Department of Correctional Services